The canton of Savigné-l'Évêque is an administrative division of the Sarthe department, northwestern France. It was created at the French canton reorganisation which came into effect in March 2015. Its seat is in Savigné-l'Évêque.

It consists of the following communes:
 
Ardenay-sur-Mérize
Le Breil-sur-Mérize
Connerré
Fatines
Lombron
Nuillé-le-Jalais
Montfort-le-Gesnois
Saint-Célerin
Saint-Corneille
Saint-Mars-la-Brière
Savigné-l'Évêque
Sillé-le-Philippe
Soulitré
Surfonds
Torcé-en-Vallée

References

Cantons of Sarthe